The following is a list of the television networks and announcers that have broadcast the Soccer Bowl, which was the annual championship competition of the North American Soccer League. The NASL was the top-level major professional soccer league in the United States and Canada that operated from 1968 to 1984.

1980s

Notes
1984 - Sportsvision televised the series in the Chicago area; this coverage was simulcast on the then-new TSN (which had started up a month earlier) cable channel in Canada.
1981 - ABC aired the Soccer Bowl on tape delay.

1970s

Notes
1978 - This would be the final NASL game broadcast TVS, as the league signed a deal with ABC Sports in the fall of 1978. Gardner would continue as the color analyst for ABC's coverage, while Miller would move on to a long career announcing Major League Baseball.
1974 - Although the Aztecs had a league-best record and points total, and rightly should have hosted the championship final, CBS intervened and strongly influenced the NASL's decision to play the match in Miami. CBS was under contract to air the game live and was unwilling to black-out the large Southern California viewing audience. At the time it was the standard in many U.S.-based sports for the host market not to broadcast games locally unless they were sold out. At the time, the Los Angeles Memorial Coliseum had a capacity of 94,500 and, even in a best-case scenario, an Aztecs sell-out was unlikely. Moreover, in an effort by CBS to capture more viewers during the peak East Coast time slot, a Los Angeles-hosted game would have begun at 12:30 (PDT) local time. The league recognized that both these factors would be detrimental to ticket sales and agreed to move the game to the Miami Orange Bowl with a 3:30 (EDT) local start. CBS had also stepped in the previous week and forced the Toros to play their semi-final match at the much-smaller Tamiami Stadium in Tamiami Park. This was done so that if Miami did win, CBS's production crews would have a full week for set-up in the Orange Bowl stadium.

1960s

Notes
In 1966, a group of sports entrepreneurs led by Bill Cox and Robert Hermann formed a consortium called the North American Professional Soccer League with the intention of forming a professional soccer league in United States and Canada. However this was just one of three groups with similar plans. The NAPSL eventually merged with one of these groups, the National Soccer League, led by Richard Millen, to form the National Professional Soccer League. A third group, the United Soccer Association was sanctioned by both the USSFA and FIFA. Because of this the NPSL was branded an outlaw league by FIFA and players faced sanctions for signing with it. Despite this the NPSL, which secured a TV contract from CBS, set about recruiting players, and announced it would be ready to launch in 1967. In December 1967, the NPSL merged with the United Soccer Association to form the North American Soccer League.

See also
List of MLS Cup broadcasters

References

External links
NASL TV: A Short History

ABC Sports
CBS Sports
USA Network Sports
The Sports Network
CTV Sports
CBC Sports
Broadcasters
CBS Sports Spectacular
TVS Television Network
Wide World of Sports (American TV series)
Lists of association football broadcasters